The 2016 Estonian Football Winter Tournament or the 2016 EJL Jalgpallihalli Turniir is the third edition of the annual tournament in Estonia.  This tournament is divided into three groups of 6 teams.

Groups

Group A

Group B

Group C

Group D

Group E

Group G

References
Home page

Winter
Estonian Football Winter Tournament